Range of Motion is a 2000 American made-for-television drama film based on a book by Elizabeth Berg, starring Rebecca De Mornay. De Mornay said, "The movie is about recognizing an inner strength, which you can call faith or love ... it's something every single person has inside of them".

Cast
  Rebecca De Mornay as Lainey Berman
  Henry Czerny as Ted Merrick
  Barclay Hope as Jay Berman
  Charlotte Arnold as Sarah Berman
  Stewart Bick as Burt Tyson
  Kim Roberts as Gloria
  Melanie Mayron as Alice Taylor
  Philip Akin as Flozell
  Lila Yee as Dr. Matthews
  Dixie Seatle as  Pat Swenson
  Phillip Shepherd as  Dr. Farrell

References

External links

2000 television films
2000 films
American television films
Films directed by Donald Wrye
2000s English-language films